The 1984 Montreal Expos season was the 16th season in franchise history. They recorded 78 wins during the 1984 season and finished in fifth place in the National League East. A managerial change occurred as Bill Virdon was replaced by Jim Fanning. The highlight of the Expos season was the acquisition of Pete Rose. After being benched in the 1983 World Series, Rose left the Phillies and signed a one-year contract with the Montreal Expos. He garnered his 4,000th hit with the team on April 13, 1984 against the Phillies, being only the second player to do so.

Offseason
 October 7, 1983: Woodie Fryman was released by the Expos.
 October 31, 1983: Tim Barrett was signed as an amateur free agent by the Expos.
 December 7, 1983: Scott Sanderson was traded by the Expos to the Chicago Cubs, and Al Newman was traded by the Expos to the San Diego Padres as part of a 3-team trade. The Padres sent Gary Lucas to the Montreal Expos. The Cubs sent Carmelo Martínez, Craig Lefferts, and Fritzie Connally to the Padres.
 December 7, 1983: Ray Burris was traded by the Expos to the Oakland Athletics for Rusty McNealy and cash.
 December 19, 1983: Dan Schatzeder was signed as a free agent by the Expos.
 December 23, 1983: Sal Butera was signed as a free agent by the Expos.
 January 20, 1984: Pete Rose was signed as a free agent by the Expos.
 February 27, 1984: Al Oliver was traded by the Expos to the San Francisco Giants for Max Venable, Fred Breining, and a player to be named later. The Giants completed the trade by sending Andy McGaffigan to the Expos on March 31.

Spring training
The Expos held spring training at West Palm Beach Municipal Stadium in West Palm Beach, Florida – a facility they shared with the Atlanta Braves. It was their eighth season at the stadium; they had conducted spring training there from 1969 to 1972 and since 1981.

Regular season
 April 13, 1984: Pete Rose doubled off of his former teammate, Phillies pitcher Jerry Koosman, for his 4,000th career hit. Rose would join Ty Cobb as only the second player to enter the 4000 hit club. The hit came 21 years to the day after Rose's first career hit. Rose was eventually traded to the Reds for infielder Tom Lawless on August 15. While with the Expos, Rose had 72 hits and batted .259.

Opening Day starters
 Gary Carter
 Andre Dawson
 Charlie Lea
 Bryan Little
 Tim Raines
 Bobby Ramos
 Pete Rose
 Ángel Salazar
 Tim Wallach

Season standings

Record vs. opponents

Notable transactions
 June 4, 1984: Anthony Young was drafted by the Expos in the 10th round of the 1984 Major League Baseball draft, but did not sign.
 July 20, 1984: Al Newman was traded by the San Diego Padres to the Montreal Expos for Greg A. Harris.
 August 16, 1984: Pete Rose was traded by the Expos to the Cincinnati Reds for Tom Lawless.

Roster

Player stats

Batting

Starters by position
Note: Pos = Position; G = Games played; AB = At bats; H = Hits; Avg. = Batting average; HR = Home runs; RBI = Runs batted in

Other batters
Note: G = Games played; AB = At bats; H = Hits; Avg. = Batting average; HR = Home runs; RBI = Runs batted in

Pitching

Starting pitchers
Note: G = Games pitched; IP = Innings pitched; W = Wins; L = Losses; ERA = Earned run average; SO = Strikeouts

Other pitchers
Note: G = Games pitched; IP = Innings pitched; W = Wins; L = Losses; ERA = Earned run average; SO = Strikeouts

Relief pitchers
Note: G = Games pitched; W = Wins; L = Losses; SV = Saves; ERA = Earned run average; SO = Strikeouts

Award winners
 Andre Dawson, Gold Glove Award, Outfield
 Tim Raines, National League Leader, 38 Doubles
 Tim Raines, National League Leader, 75 Stolen Bases

1984 Major League Baseball All-Star Game
 Gary Carter, catcher, starter
 Charlie Lea, pitcher, starter
 Tim Raines, outfield, reserve
 Tim Wallach, third baseman, reserve

Farm system

Notes

References

External links
 1984 Montreal Expos team at Baseball-Reference
 1984 Montreal Expos team at baseball-almanac.com
 

Montreal Expos seasons
Montreal Expos season
1980s in Montreal
1984 in Quebec